The Master of the Hartford Still-Life or simply the Master of Hartford was an Italian painter in the Baroque style who worked in Rome from the 1590s to the 1610s and specialized in lavish still-lifes. Together with the Master of the Acquavella Still-Life, he helped establish a brighter style for the Italian still-life, as opposed to the prevailing dark style of the Netherlands.

Works 
His notname is derived from a still-life with flower and fruits, on a table, kept at the Wadsworth Atheneum in Hartford, Connecticut. By comparing this painting with similar ones, a style group was created.

Certain elements reminiscent of Caravaggio have been detected. Suggestions that these are by the young Caravaggio himself are reasonable, given the similarity of his lighting effects, but it seems more reasonable to assume that he was one of Caravaggio's students.

Three painters have received serious consideration as being this Master; Francesco Zucchi (?-1621), Bernardino Cesari and Giovanni Battista Crescenzi. Others are in private collections.

References

Further reading 
 E. Zafran, J. u. M. Ringling: Renaissance to Rococo: Masterpieces from the Wadsworth Atheneum Museum of Art. New Haven (Yale University Press) 2004

External links 

17th-century Italian painters
Italian Baroque painters
Italian still life painters
Hartford Still-Life